The 2009 FIS Ski Jumping Grand Prix was the 16th Summer Grand Prix season in ski jumping on plastic. Season began on 8 August 2009 in Hinterzarten, Germany and ended on 3 October 2009 in Klingenthal.

Other competitive circuits this season included the World Cup and Continental Cup.

Calendar

Men

Men's team

Standings

Overall

Nations Cup

Four Nations Grand Prix

References

Grand Prix
FIS Grand Prix Ski Jumping